Zhejiang Dahua Technology Co., Ltd. (commonly known as Dahua Technology) is a partly state-owned publicly traded company based in Binjiang District, Hangzhou, which manufactures video surveillance equipment. It was founded in 2001 by Fu Liquan. Dahua Technology has been listed on the Shenzhen Stock Exchange since its IPO in 2008. , Dahua is the second largest video surveillance company in the world in terms of revenue after Hikvision.

History
In 2018, Dahua acquired security video camera company Lorex.

In November 2020, Dahua won a US$9 million, 1,900-camera smart city project with the public security bureau of Jiexiu.

In April 2021, Motorola Solutions announced that IndigoVision, a Motorola Solutions-owned company, would no longer relabel Dahua cameras, citing U.S. NDAA and supply-chain concerns.

In 2021, Best Buy, Home Depot, and Lowe's stopped selling cameras from Dahua brand Lorex due to concerns about Dahua's complicity in surveillance and human rights violations in Xinjiang. In 2022, Dahua sold Lorex to Taiwan-based Skywatch.

The Security Industry Association, a U.S.-based trade organization representing electronic and physical security solutions providers the United States, terminated Dahua Technology's membership on June 1, 2021, citing unnamed violations of its code of ethics.

In November 2021, Dahua was named in the Secure Equipment Act as one of several entities prohibited from receiving U.S. telecommunication equipment licenses due to national security reasons. During the same month, Dahua provided an electronic security system to processed food company Empresa Panamena de Alimentos (EPA) in Panama.

Sanctions and bans

Australia 
In February 2023, Australia's Department of Defence announced that it will remove cameras made by Dahua from its buildings.

United Kingdom 
In November 2022, the UK prohibited the use of Dahua equipment in government buildings.

United States 
In October 2019, the U.S. government placed Dahua on the Bureau of Industry and Security's Entity List for its role in mass surveillance of Uyghurs in Xinjiang and of other ethnic and religious minorities in China. The John S. McCain National Defense Authorization Act for Fiscal Year 2019 barred the use of Dahua equipment in U.S. federal contracts.

In March 2021, the Federal Communications Commission (FCC) declared that Dahua services and equipment "pose an unacceptable risk to U.S. national security.” That same year, Sam Biddle of The Intercept reported that the U.S. government continued to purchase Dahua-manufactured equipment post-NDAA, raising questions about the effectiveness of the sanctions.

In October 2022, the United States Department of Defense added Dahua to a list of "Chinese military companies" operating in the U.S.

In November 2022, the FCC imposed an "Interim Freeze Order" on Dahua Technology for national security reasons, effectively barring the sale or import of new equipment made by the company. Dahua Technology has stated that this "Interim Freeze Order" does not impact any of its existing products, nor does not prohibit it from introducing new products in the U.S. Dahua Technology has remained ambiguous about whether or not it will issue a legal challenge to the FCC in the wake of its order. In the wake of Dahua Technology's statement, surveillance industry publication IPVM issued a report accusing Dahua Technology of "misleading" the American public through its use of the phrase "interim freeze".

Corporate affairs

Shareholders 
Dahua Technology is majority owned by Fu Liquan and his wife Chen Ailing. , Fu owned 34.18% shares as the largest shareholder, while Chen owned 2.38%.

According to its 2020 annual financial report, Dahua Technology is also partially state-owned by Central Huijin Asset Management and China Galaxy Securities Co., Ltd. at 1.05% and 1.82 respectively. Central Huijin Investment is a state-owned enterprise and wholly owned subsidiary of China Investment Corporation, a sovereign wealth fund that reports to the State Council of the People's Republic of China.

State-owned telecommunications company China Mobile acquired a 10.42% stake in Dahua in March 2021.

Partnerships 
In 2016, Dahua partnered with Dell to build smart security systems. In 2017, Dahua partnered with Beijing University of Posts and Telecommunications (BUPT) to build a joint intelligent video laboratory. Amazon Web Services provides cloud services to Dahua.

In late 2019, Dahua began to provide video surveillance to the Vatican Museums over a 5-year period.

In August 2022, Dahua partnered with ABCOM Distribution LLC for a distribution partnership in MENA.

Cybersecurity vulnerabilities 
In September 2016, the largest DDoS attack to date, on KrebsOnSecurity.com, was traced back to a botnet. According to internet provider Level 3 Communications, the most commonly infected devices in this botnet were Dahua and Dahua OEM cameras and DVRs. Nearly one million Dahua devices were infected with the BASHLITE malware. A vulnerability in most of Dahua's cameras allowed "anyone to take full control of the devices' underlying Linux operating system just by typing a random username with too many characters." This was exploited, and malware installed on devices that allowed them to be used in "both DDoS attacks as well as for extortion campaigns using ransomware."

In March 2017 a backdoor into many Dahua cameras and DVRs was discovered by security researchers working for a Fortune 500 company. The vulnerability had been activated on cameras within the Fortune 500 company's network, and the data trafficked to China through the company's firewall. Using a web browser, the vulnerability allowed unauthorized people to remotely download a device's database of usernames and passwords and subsequently gain access to it. Dahua issued a firmware update to fix the vulnerability in 11 of its products. Security researchers discovered that the updated firmware contained the same vulnerability but that the vulnerability had been relocated to a different part of the code. This was characterized by the security researchers as deliberate deception.

In September 2021, Dahua acknowledged an identity authentication bypass vulnerability affecting over 30 device models that, if exploited, can allow attackers to "bypass device identity authentication by constructing malicious data packets." In October 2021, TechCrunch reported that The Home Depot and Best Buy stopped selling Lorex-branded Dahua and Ezviz products.

Mass surveillance of ethnic minorities 

Dahua has played a role in the mass surveillance of Uyghurs in Xinjiang. In November 2020, after security researchers identified facial identification software code with designations by ethnicity, Dahua removed the code in question from GitHub. In February 2021, the Los Angeles Times published an investigation of Dahua's technology for the purpose of Uyghur surveillance.

See also
 Mass surveillance in China

References

External links 
  

Technology companies of China
Companies based in Hangzhou
Companies established in 2001
Companies listed on the Shenzhen Stock Exchange
Road traffic management
Video surveillance companies
Chinese brands
Government-owned companies of China